Caught in Berlin's Underworld (German: Die Ausgestoßenen) is a 1927 German silent drama film directed by Martin Berger and starring Fritz Kortner, Maly Delschaft and Hans Stüwe.

Cast
 Fritz Kortner as Lord  
 Maly Delschaft as Frau Nadt  
 Hans Stüwe as Nadt / Dr. Themal  
 Mary Johnson as Hilde Maroff  
 Julia Serda as Maroffs Frau  
 Rudolf Lettinger as Maroff  
 Luigi Serventi as Graf Egglio  
 Andreas Behrens-Klausen as Gefangener  
 Johanna Hofer as Frau des Gefangenen 
 Heinrich George

References

Bibliography
 Grange, William. Cultural Chronicle of the Weimar Republic. Scarecrow Press, 2008.

External links

1927 films
Films of the Weimar Republic
Films directed by Martin Berger
German silent feature films
German black-and-white films
German drama films
1927 drama films
Silent drama films
1920s German films